Plopul River may refer to the following rivers in Romania:

 Plopul, tributary of the Galbena in Hunedoara County
 Plopul, tributary of the Moișa in Suceava County

See also
 Recea River (Vâlcea), aka Plopi River
 Plopoasa River
 Plopu River